Malichus is a given name. It may refer to:

 Malichus I, a king of Nabataea who reigned from 59 to 30 BC.
 Malichus II, a king of Nabataea who reigned from 40 to 70 AD.
 Malichus, assassin of Antipater the Idumaean

See also
 List of Nabataean kings
 Malchus (disambiguation)